Dahn is a municipality in the Südwestpfalz district, in Rhineland-Palatinate, Germany. It is situated in the Palatinate Forest, approximately 15 km southeast of Pirmasens, and 25 km west of Landau. It is part of the Verbandsgemeinde ("collective municipality") of Dahner Felsenland.

Geography
Dahn is located 210 m above sea level in a valley of the Dahner Felsenland, a part of the Wasgau, which is itself a part of the Palatinate Forest. A small creek, the Lauter, flows through Dahn, and here, in the area of its headwaters, is called the Wieslauter. The border with Alsace (France) is located 10 km south of Dahn.

History

Coat of arms

In 1952 the coat of arms was recreated as a result of historical research. The new shield, parted per chevron, has on its dexter chief: azure (blue), a cross argent (silver); on its sinister chief: gules (red), an eagle argent (silver) and on its base: or (gold), a fir tree vert (green).

The fir tree ([assumed to be linked to the name of the town]) was originally the only symbol of Dahn. However, the new coat of arms also commemorates the history of Dahn. The knights of Than, feudatories of the bishop of Speyer, were the lords of Dahn for over four hundred years and may have called themselves after the town; the white eagle with red background is derived from the knight's coat of arms, which showed three white eagles (perhaps the symbol for the three castles of Altdahn, Grafdahn and Tannstein). After the extinction of the House of Than in 1603, Dahn was the head office of a department of the diocese of Speyer until the beginning of the French revolutionary wars in 1797/98. The white cross on blue was adopted from the arms of Speyer (both the diocese and the Prince-Bishopric. The fir tree remains as a reference to the name of the town, which was the old seal of the Court, as well as the scenic location of the city in the Palatinate Forest.

Municipal law

Politics
Aldermen:(Elections on 25 May 2014, number of mandates: 20)

 FD = Wählergruppe Für (free voters for) Dahn e. V.
 WGK = Wählergruppe (free voters) Koch

Culture and sightseeing
In the neighbourhood of Dahn are the ruins of a triple castle complex, comprising  Altdahn, Grafendahn and Tanstein castles, as well as the castle of Neudahn, which is also a ruin, albeit less spectacular.

South of the town, on the edge of the Hochstein rocks is Dahn Cemetery, a war cemetery for soldiers of the Palatinate and the Alsace who fell during the Ardennes Offensive in the Second World War.

A 70 m tall rock juts above the city and is a famous destination for rock climbers during the summer. Its name Jungfernsprung ("Virgin's Leap"), is derived from an old legend.

Even nowadays the forests and sandstone rocks surrounding Dahn give fantastic Lebensraum to the fabulous Elwetritsche. To honour the excellent relation between inhabitants of Dahn and Elwetritsche there is an Elwetritsche lecture trail, an Elwetritsche hiking trail as well as Elwetritsche fountains and further memorials.

Economy and infrastructures

Economy
Dahn, unfortunately, has had to survive without much industry due to the Südwestpfalz district's structural weakness. Because of this the population has declined. Only tourism shows an upwards trend because nature in the surrounding area is largely intact and frequently quite spectacular.

Traffic
The B 427 federal road (from Hinterweidenthal to Bad Bergzabern) passes through Dahn. The plan for a junction between the road and the A 8 motorway (from Pirmasens to Karlsruhe) which was planned to run past Dahn has never been realised.

Since 1997 the Wieslauter Railway calls at Dahn on Sundays and statutory holidays. It connects Hinterweidenthal and Bundenthal. Regular public train services stopped in 1966.

Healthcare
The public hospital, St. Josef Krankenhaus, closed at the end of 2005 as a result of funding issues. The Felsenland-Klinik, a psychotheraputic hospital, uses its own specially developed technique of psychoanalytic hypnosis. Dahn also has an outpatient living group of the Pfalzklinikum für Psychiatrie und Neurologie ("Palatinate Hospital For Psychiatrics And Neurology"), which is situated in Klingenmünster.

Education
The primary school in Dahn serves the municipality of Dahn as well as Schindhard and Erfweiler. The school centre of Dahn is within the commuter belt of  a Realschule Plus and the Otfried-von-Weißenburg-Gymnasium of Western-Wasgau. This gymnasium is the only one in the  Südwestpfalz administrative district. Dahn also has a special needs school (the Ritter-von-Tann-Förderschule). During the years 1958 through 1994 the Catholic Church operated a boarding school, the Studienheim St. Pirmin.

Personalities

Sons and daughters of the city of Dahn
 Stefan Baron (*1948), trust spokesman of the Deutsche Bundesbank
 Alexander Fuhr (*1969), politician, member of the Landtag of Rhineland-Palatinate (Social Democratic Party of Germany (SPD)), mayor of the city of Dahn
 Theodor Kissel (*1962), historian and author
 Ingbert Naab (1885–1935), Friars Minor Capuchin and resistance fighter against National Socialism, beatified, Pater-Ingbert-Naab-street bears his name
 Theodor Schaller (1900–1993), Theologian and church president

Personalities, operated in Dahn
 Stephan Eisel (*1955), politician (Christian Democratic Union (CDU)), visited the Otfrid-von-Weißenburg-Gymnasium
 Heiner Geißler (1930-2017), politician (Christian Democratic Union (CDU)), had his office in Dahn 
 Fritz Korter (1892–1945), sculptor, creator of the Dahn war memorial
 Friedl Rinder (1905–2001), chess player, winner of the 1959 German Chess Women's Championship, which took place in Dahn

References

External links

 Municipality of Dahn (German)
 Verbandsgemeinde Dahner Felsenland (multilingual)
 Pater Ingbert Naab (German)

 
Towns in Rhineland-Palatinate
Palatinate Forest
South Palatinate
Südwestpfalz